The 2020–21 Brisbane Heat Women's season was the sixth in the team's history. Coached by Ashley Noffke and captained by Jess Jonassen, the Heat entered WBBL06 as the double defending champions, having won both WBBL04 and WBBL05 titles. Playing the entirety of the tournament in a bio-secure Sydney hub due to the COVID-19 pandemic, they finished the regular season with seven-straight wins to claim second position on the points table, qualifying for the knockout stage. In a "crazy" semi-final encounter with the Sydney Thunder, the Heat suffered an "epic meltdown" to lose by twelve runs and have their hopes of a three-peat dashed.

Squad 
Each 2020–21 squad was made up of 15 active players. Teams could sign up to five 'marquee players', with a maximum of three of those from overseas. Marquees were classed as any overseas player, or a local player who holds a Cricket Australia national contract at the start of the WBBL|06 signing period.

Personnel changes made ahead of the season included:

 Beth Mooney departed the Heat, signing with the Perth Scorchers.
 Sammy-Jo Johnson also departed, signing with the Sydney Thunder.
 Georgia Redmayne joined the Heat, departing the Scorchers.
 Nicola Hancock also joined the Heat, departing the Melbourne Stars.
 South African marquee player Nadine de Klerk signed with the Heat, marking her first appearance in the league.
 Jess Jonassen was appointed as the team's new captain, replacing Kirby Short who retired from cricket at the end of WBBL|05.

The table below lists the Heat players and their key stats (including runs scored, batting strike rate, wickets taken, economy rate, catches and stumpings) for the season.

Ladder

Fixtures 
All times are local time

Regular season

Knockout phase

Tammy Beaumont launched the Sydney Thunder off to a fast start with 27 runs from 20 deliveries, though she was brought undone by a Nicola Hancock slower ball during the last over of the powerplay. The Thunder struggled throughout the middle portion of the innings, especially troubled by Brisbane Heat bowlers Nadine de Klerk and Amelia Kerr who collectively managed economical figures of 3/30 from seven overs. Instead of choosing to bowl the 20th over herself, Heat captain Jess Jonassen turned to the medium pace of Delissa Kimmince to close out the innings. Thunder captain Rachael Haynes ensured a respectable total for her team, finishing on 48 not out, as Sydney scored 15 from the final over and set Brisbane a target of 144 for victory.

Thunder spinner Samantha Bates struck early in the run chase, bowling Grace Harris for six, before being hit for three consecutive boundaries in the fourth over by Georgia Redmayne. Soon after playing-and-missing three times in a row to Shabnim Ismail, Redmayne was caught for 25 by Haynes at mid-on off the bowling of Sammy-Jo Johnson. Promoted up the batting order to number three, de Klerk formed a steady partnership with Jonassen, putting on 46 runs together in little more than six overs. When Jonassen fell for 19 (caught-and-bowled by Hannah Darlington) the Heat required a manageable task of 64 runs from 52 balls with seven wickets in hand. In the following over, de Klerk was run out by a direct hit from Beaumont for a run-a-ball 27. Facing her first delivery, Laura Kimmince survived an extremely close call, playing a flighted Bates delivery on to leg stump—the ball, however, did not connect with enough force to dislodge the bails. Kimmince quickly took advantage of her luck, manically compiling 37 runs from her next 15 balls. Although her aggressive strokeplay led to a plummeting required run rate, she was involved in two running-between-the-wickets mix-ups which led to the run outs of Georgia Voll and Amelia Kerr, keeping the door ajar for a miraculous Sydney comeback.

On the last delivery of the 17th over, with the Brisbane Heat needing just 16 runs to win, Laura Kimmince attempted a high-risk reverse slog against Samantha Bates, only to miss the ball which deflected off her thigh before crashing into the stumps—the bails, this time, were sent airborne. Taking the ball in the 18th over, Hannah Darlington struck twice in two balls to put the Heat in the precarious position of needing 14 runs with only one wicket in hand. Sammy-Jo Johnson completed the Thunder's remarkable resurrection on the third ball of the 19th over, removing Delissa Kimmince for a golden duck via caught-and-bowled, sealing a twelve-run victory and cementing Sydney's spot in Saturday's final. Brisbane's sudden "horror" collapse consisted of losing six wickets for twelve runs, ultimately ending their seven-match winning streak and quest for a three-peat. Media outlets described the match and its unlikely outcome as "chaotic," a "rollercoaster" and "one of the best comebacks in the WBBL's short history." Seven Network commentator Trent Copeland said "when Kimmince was flying you thought the game was gone," and Fox Cricket analyst Molly Strano commented "I don't think I've seen such massive swings in momentum in a game, ever."

Statistics and awards 
 Most runs: Georgia Redmayne – 357 (9th in the league)
Highest score in an innings: Grace Harris – 81* (52) vs Melbourne Stars, 8 November
Most wickets: Jess Jonassen, Amelia Kerr – 17 each (equal 6th in the league)
Best bowling figures in an innings: Georgia Prestwidge – 4/12 (3.2 overs) vs Melbourne Renegades, 22 November
Most catches: Georgia Prestwidge – 8 (equal 3rd in the league)
Player of the Match awards:
Laura Kimmince – 3
Grace Harris, Georgia Redmayne – 2 each
Georgia Prestwidge – 1
WBBL06 Player of the Tournament: Grace Harris (equal 4th)
WBBL06 Team of the Tournament: Laura Kimmince, Ashley Noffke (coach)
Heat Most Valuable Player: Amelia Kerr

References 

2020–21 Women's Big Bash League season by team
Brisbane Heat (WBBL)